The 2022 FIBA European Championship for Small Countries was the 18th edition of the FIBA European Championship for Small Countries. It was hosted in Ta' Qali, Malta. It took place from 28 June to 3 July 2022.

Ireland were the current defending champion, but they didn't participate.

Teams 
Ireland, Moldova and Norway did not participate this season. They were replaced by Armenia, winners in 2016, which was about to comeback to competition after its withdrawal from the EuroBasket 2021 pre-qualifiers, and Azerbaijan, winners in 2006 and 2008, which was set for a comeback to competition since its participation in the EuroBasket 2013 qualification.

Group phase 
All times are local (UTC+1).

Group A

Group B

Final round

Bracket

Quarterfinals

Semifinals

Fifth place game

Third place game

Final

Awards 
The tournament's individual award were announced after the final on 3 July.

 Most Valuable Player:  Chris Jones
 All-Star Five:
 G  Guillem Colom
 G  Chris Jones
 F  Andre Spight
 F  Orhan Aydın
 C  Samuel Deguara

References

External links 

 FIBA European Championship for Small Countries at FIBA.com

FIBA European Championship for Small Countries
FIBA European Championship for Small Countries
FIBA European Championship for Small Countries
Basketball competitions in Malta
International sports competitions hosted by Malta
FIBA
FIBA